Cranesville Swamp Preserve is a  preserve situated in Preston County, West Virginia and Garrett County, Maryland. It is one of the few remaining boreal bogs in the southern United States,
 unusual in harboring many plants and animals that are normally only seen in more northern climates.

History
The Nature Conservancy purchased the  beginning in 1960.  In October 1964, the site was designated as one of the first National Natural Landmarks in the country.

Geology
Cranesville Swamp is situated in a natural bowl, or "frost pocket," creating a climate that is more consistent with more northerly regions.

Ecology

Flora
Cranesville Swamp's unusual setting allows 19 different plant communities to flourish,

with the most dominant species being, among others, sphagnum moss, speckled alder (Alnus rugosa),  various sedges (Carex folliculata, and C. stricta) and grasses.   Bog species include round-leaved sundew (Drosera rotundifolia) and narrowleaf gentian (Gentiana linearis).

The swamp is also home to the southernmost natural community of American larches.

Fauna
In addition to black bear, porcupine, snowshoe hare and a wide variety of birds, the rare northern water shrew has been documented here. Birders have also noted the golden-crowned kinglet and Nashville warbler, rarely seen in this area.

References

Appalachian bogs
Bogs of Maryland
Bogs of West Virginia
Protected areas of Preston County, West Virginia
Protected areas of Garrett County, Maryland
Nature Conservancy preserves
Nature reserves in Maryland
Nature reserves in West Virginia
National Natural Landmarks in Maryland
National Natural Landmarks in West Virginia
Landforms of Preston County, West Virginia
Landforms of Garrett County, Maryland
IUCN Category V